The Copa Polla Gol 1985 was the 15th edition of the Chilean Cup tournament. The competition started on January 26, 1985 and concluded on May 8, 1985. First and second level teams took part in the tournament. Colo-Colo won the competition for their fifth time, beating Palestino 1–0 in the final.  The points system used in the first round of the tournament was; 2 points for the winner but, if the winner team scores 4 or more goals, they won 3 points; in case of a tie, every team took 1 point but, no points for each team if the score were 0–0. The winners of each group, plus the second place of group 3, and the two best second places of the others groups, advanced to the quarterfinals.

Calendar

Group Round

Group 1

Group 2

Group 3

Group 4

Group 5

Quarterfinals

Semifinals

Final

Top goalscorer
 Alfredo Núñez (Palestino) 11 goals
 Luis Martínez (Curicó Unido) 11 goals

See also
 1985 Campeonato Nacional

References

Sources
solofutbol

Chile
1985
1985 in Chilean football